Syd Farrimond (17 July 1940 – 8 May 2022) was an English footballer who played as a left back for Bolton Wanderers, Tranmere Rovers and Halifax Town. He made 153 appearances for Tranmere, of which 134 were in the Football League.

Farrimond died on 8 May 2022, at the age of 81, due to complications from dementia.

References

1940 births
2022 deaths
People from Hindley, Greater Manchester
English footballers
Footballers from Greater Manchester
Association football fullbacks
English Football League players
Bolton Wanderers F.C. players
Tranmere Rovers F.C. players
Halifax Town A.F.C. players
Deaths from dementia in the United Kingdom